The WCCW Cotton Bowl Extravaganza was an annual professional wrestling supercard promoted by Fritz Von Erich's World Class Championship Wrestling / World Class Wrestling Association. It was held in October every year from 1984 through 1988. All Cotton Bowl Extravaganza events were held at the Cotton Bowl in Dallas, Texas

1st Cotton Bowl Extravaganza

The 1st Cotton Bowl Extravaganza was a major professional wrestling show held by the Dallas, Texas based World Class Championship Wrestling (WCCW) promotion on October 27, 1984 at the Cotton Bowl football stadium in Dallas. The ninth match of the night between Kevin Von Erich and Chris Adams ended in controversy as Kevin pinned Adams while Adams twice had his shoulder up, while referee David Manning administered the three count. After the match, Adams smashed a wooden chair over Von Erich's head, resulting in a concussion and loss of blood when the chair broken in half, scraping his head. This was used as a storyline excuse to replace Kevin Von Erich in the main event with Bobby Fulton for the six-man tag team match.

2nd Cotton Bowl Extravaganza

The 2nd Cotton Bowl Extravaganza was a major professional wrestling show held by the Dallas, Texas based World Class Championship Wrestling (WCCW) promotion on October 6, 1985 at the Cotton Bowl football stadium in Dallas. The main event saw the team of Kerry and Kevin Von Erich defeated The Dynamic Duo (Chris Adams and Gino Hernandez) when Kerry pinned Adams. After the match, Adams and Hernandez were shaved bald. Gino attempted to escape during the hair-cutting, but was tackled by Chris Von Erich at ringside. Cousin Lance Von Erich made his World Class debut in this match.

3rd Cotton Bowl Extravaganza

The 3rd Cotton Bowl Extravaganza was a major professional wrestling show held by the Dallas, Texas based World Class Wrestling Association (WCWA) promotion on October 12, 1986 at the Cotton Bowl football stadium in Dallas. Ricky Steamboat who worked on the undercard was under contract with the World Wrestling Federation (WWF) but they allowed him to work the WCCW show.

4th Cotton Bowl Extravaganza

The 4th Cotton Bowl Extravaganza was a major professional wrestling show held by the Dallas, Texas based World Class Wrestling Association (WCWA) promotion on October 17, 1987 at the Cotton Bowl football stadium in Dallas. In the main event it appeared that Kevin Von Erich defeated Al Perez to win the WCWA Heavyweight Championship, but the championship was later returned to Al Perez due to outside interference during the match and Kevin Von Erich was not officially considered the champion.

5th Cotton Bowl Extravaganza

The 5th Cotton Bowl Extravaganza was a major professional wrestling show held by the Dallas, Texas based World Class Wrestling Association (WCWA) promotion on October 15, 1988 at the Cotton Bowl football stadium in Dallas. The main event match had both the WCWA World Heavyweight Championship and the AWA World Heavyweight Championship on the line as Kerry Von Erich faced off against AWA Champion Jerry Lawler. Von Erich won the match and left the arena with the AWA Championship it was later returned to Jerry Lawler and not officially recognized by the AWA.

References

1984 in professional wrestling
1985 in professional wrestling
1986 in professional wrestling
1987 in professional wrestling
1988 in professional wrestling
Cotton Bowl Extravaganza
Events in Dallas
1984 in Texas
1985 in Texas
1986 in Texas
1987 in Texas
1988 in Texas
Professional wrestling in the Dallas–Fort Worth metroplex